Liliana Mariel Góngora (born 24 November 1965) is an Argentine middle-distance runner. She competed in the women's 1500 metres at the 1984 Summer Olympics.

References

1965 births
Living people
Athletes (track and field) at the 1984 Summer Olympics
Argentine female middle-distance runners
Olympic athletes of Argentina
Place of birth missing (living people)
South American Games gold medalists for Argentina
South American Games medalists in athletics
Competitors at the 1982 Southern Cross Games
Competitors at the 1983 Pan American Games
Pan American Games competitors for Argentina
20th-century Argentine women
21st-century Argentine women